The G beta-gamma complex (Gβγ) is a tightly bound dimeric protein complex, composed of one Gβ and one Gγ subunit, and is a component of heterotrimeric G proteins. Heterotrimeric G proteins, also called guanosine nucleotide-binding proteins, consist of three subunits, called alpha, beta, and gamma subunits, or Gα, Gβ, and Gγ. When a G protein-coupled receptor (GPCR) is activated, Gα dissociates from Gβγ, allowing both subunits to perform their respective downstream signaling effects. One of the major functions of Gβγ is the inhibition of the Gα subunit.

History
The individual subunits of the G protein complex were first identified in 1980 when the regulatory component of adenylate cyclase was successfully purified, yielding three polypeptides of different molecular weights. Initially, it was thought that Gα, the largest subunit, was the major effector regulatory subunit, and that Gβγ was largely responsible for inactivating the Gα subunit and enhancing membrane binding. However, downstream signalling effects of Gβγ were later discovered when the purified Gβγ complex was found to activate a cardiac muscarinic K+ channel. Shortly after, the Gβγ complex associated with a mating factor receptor-coupled G protein in yeast was found to initiate a pheromone response. Although these hypotheses were initially controversial, Gβγ has since been shown to directly regulate as many different protein targets as the Gα subunit.

Recently, possible roles of the Gβγ complex in retinal rod photoreceptors have been investigated, with some evidence for the maintenance of Gα inactivation. However, these conclusions were drawn from in vitro experiments under unphysiological conditions, and the physiological role of the Gβγ complex in vision is still unclear. Nevertheless, recent in vivo findings demonstrate the necessity of the transducin Gβγ complex in the functioning of rod photoreceptors under low light conditions.

Structure 
The Gβγ subunit is a dimer composed of two polypeptides, however it acts functionally as a monomer, as the individual subunits do not separate, and have not been found to function independently.
The Gβ subunit is a member of the β-propeller family of proteins, which typically possess 4-8 antiparallel β-sheets arranged in the shape of a propeller. Gβ contains a 7 bladed β-propeller, each blade arranged around a central axis and composed of 4 antiparallel β-sheets. The amino acid sequence contains 7 WD repeat motifs of about 40 amino acids, each highly conserved and possessing the Trp-Asp dipeptide that gives the repeat its name. 
The Gγ subunit is considerably smaller than Gβ, and is unstable on its own, requiring interaction with Gβ to fold, explaining the close association of the dimer. In the Gβγ dimer, the Gγ subunit wraps around the outside of Gβ, interacting through hydrophobic associations, and exhibits no tertiary interactions with itself. The N terminus helical domains of the two subunits form a coiled coil with one another that typically extends away from the core of the dimer. 
To date, 5 β-subunit and 11 γ-subunit genes and have been identified in mammals. The Gβ genes have very similar sequences, while significantly greater variation is seen in the Gγ genes, indicating that the functional specificity of the Gβγ dimer may be dependent on the type of Gγ subunit involved.
Of additional structural interest is the discovery of a so-called “hotspot” present on the surface of the Gβγ dimer; a specific site of the protein that binds to diverse range of peptides and is thought to be a contributing factor in the ability of Gβγ to interact with a wide variety of effectors.

Synthesis and Modification
Synthesis of the subunits occurs in the cytosol. Folding of the β-subunit is thought to be aided by the chaperone CCT (chaperonin containing tailless-complex polypeptide 1), which also prevents aggregation of folded subunits. A second chaperone, PhLP (phosducin-like protein), binds to the CCT/Gβ complex, and is phosphorylated, allowing CCT to dissociate and Gγ to bind. Finally, PhLP is released, exposing the binding site for Gα, allowing for formation of the final trimer at the endoplasmic reticulum, where it is targeted to the plasma membrane. Gγ subunits are known to be prenylated (covalently modified by the addition of lipid moieties) prior to addition to Gβ, which itself has not been found to be modified. This prenylation is thought to be involved in directing the interaction of the subunit both with membrane lipids and other proteins.

Function 
The Gβγ complex is an essential element in the GPCR signaling cascade. It has two main states for which it performs different functions. When Gβγ is interacting with Gα it functions as a negative regulator. In the heterotrimer form, the Gβγ dimer increases the affinity of Gα for GDP, which causes the G protein to be in an inactive state. For the Gα subunit to become active, the nucleotide exchange must be induced by the GPCR. Studies have shown that it is the Gβγ dimer that demonstrates specificity for the appropriate receptor and that the Gγ subunit actually enhances the interaction of the Gα subunit with the GPCR. The GPCR is activated by an extracellular ligand and subsequently activates the G protein heterotrimer by causing a conformational change in the Gα subunit. This causes the replacement of GDP with GTP as well as the physical dissociation of the Gα and the Gβγ complex.

Once separated, both Gα and Gβγ are free to participate in their own distinct signaling pathways. Gβγ does not go through any conformational changes when it dissociates from Gα and it acts as a signaling molecule as a dimer. The Gβγ dimer has been found to interact with many different effector molecules by protein-protein interactions. Different combinations of the Gβ and Gγ subtypes can influence different effectors and work exclusively or synergistically with the Gα subunit.

Gβγ signaling is diverse, inhibiting or activating many downstream events depending on its interaction with different effectors. Researchers have discovered that Gβγ regulates ion channels, such as G protein-gated inward rectifier channels, as well as calcium channels. In human PBMC, Gβγ complex has been shown to activate phosphorylation of ERK1/2. Another example of Gβγ signaling is its effect of activating or inhibiting adenylyl cyclase leading to the intracellular increase or decrease of the secondary messenger cyclic AMP. For more examples of Gβγ signaling see table. However, the full extent of Gβγ signaling has not yet been discovered.

Medical implications

Drug design
The Gβγ subunit plays a variety of roles in cell signalling processes and as such researchers are now examining its potential as a therapeutic drug target for the treatment of many medical conditions. However, it is recognized that there are a number of considerations to keep in mind when designing a drug which targets the Gβγ subunit:

 The Gβγ  subunit is essential for the formation of heterotrimeric G protein through its association with the Gα subunit allowing the G proteins coupling to the GPCR. Therefore, any agent inhibiting the Gβγ subunits signalling effects must not interfere with the heterotrimeric G protein formation or Gα subunit signalling.
 Gβγ  expression is universal throughout almost all the cells of the body so any agent acting to inhibit this subunit could elicit numerous side effects.
 Small molecule inhibitors that target the coupling of Gβγ  to specific effectors and do not interfere with normal G protein cycling/ heterotrimeric formation, have the potential to work as therapeutic agents in treating some specific diseases.

Targeting the Gβγ subunit in treatment
Research has been conducted on how altering the actions of Gβγ subunits could be beneficial for the treatment of certain medical conditions. Gβγ signalling has been examined for its role in a variety of conditions including heart failure, inflammation and leukemia.

Heart failure

Heart failure can be characterized by a loss of β adrenergic receptor (βAR) signalling in heart cells. When the βAR is stimulated by catecholamines such as adrenaline and noradrenaline, there is normally an increase in the contractility of the heart. However, in heart failure there are sustained and elevated levels of catecholamines which result in chronic desensitization of the βAR receptor. This leads to a decrease in the strength of heart contractions. Some research suggests that this chronic desensitization is due to the over activation of a kinase, G protein-coupled receptor kinase 2 (GRK2), which phosphorylates and deactivates certain G protein coupled receptors . When the G protein coupled receptor is activated, the Gβγ subunit recruits GRK2 which then phosphorylates and desensitizes GPCRs like the βAR. Preventing the interaction of the βγ subunit with GRK2 has therefore been studied as a potential target for increasing heart contractile function. The developed molecule GRK2ct is a protein inhibitor which inhibits the signalling properties of Gβγ subunit but does not interfere with alpha subunit signalling. The over expression of GRK2ct has been shown to significantly rescue cardiac function in murine models of heart failure by blocking Gβγ subunit signalling. In another study, biopsies were taken from patients with heart failure and virally induced overexpression of GRK2ct in the heart myocytes. Other tests showed an improvement in cardiac cell contractile function by inhibiting Gβγ.

Inflammation

When particular GPCRs are activated by their specific chemokines Gβγ directly activates PI3Kγ which is involved in the recruitment of neutrophils that contribute to inflammation. It has been discovered that the inhibition of PI3Kγ significantly reduces inflammation. PI3Kγ is the intended target molecule in the prevention of inflammation as it is the common signalling effector of many different chemokine and receptor types involved in promoting inflammation.  Although PI3Kγ is the intended target there are other isoforms of PI3 which perform different functions from PI3Kγ. Since PI3Kγ is specifically regulated by Gβγ, while other isoforms of PI3 are largely regulated by other molecules, inhibiting Gβγ signalling would provide the desired specificity of a therapeutic agent designed to treat inflammation.

Leukemia

The Gβγ subunit has been shown to activate a Rho guanine nucleotide exchange factor (RhoGef) gene PLEKHG2 which is upregulated in a number of leukemia cell lines and mouse models of leukemia. Lymphocyte chemotaxis as a result of Rac and CDC42 activation as well as actin polymerization is believed to be regulated by the Gβγ activated RhoGef. Therefore, a drug inhibiting the Gβγ could play a role in the treatment of leukemia.

References 

G proteins
Protein complexes